Palau gained its independence October 1, 1994, with the entry into force of the Compact of Free Association with the United States. Palau was the last Trust Territory of the Pacific Islands territories to gain its independence. Under the Compact, the U.S. remains responsible for Palau's defense for 50 years.

Palau is a sovereign nation and conducts its own foreign relations. From its independence until July 2019, Palau had established diplomatic relations with over 80 sovereign countries. Since then, it has established bilateral relations with over 10 other nations, raising the current number of diplomatic partners of Palau to over 50.

Palau was admitted to the United Nations on December 15, 1994, and has since joined several other international organizations. In 2004, Stuart Beck was appointed to serve as Palau's first permanent representative to the United Nations. Along with the other former Trust Territories, Palau is one of a handful of countries that regularly votes with Israel in the United Nations General Assembly.

Diplomatic relations

Bilateral relations

Military relations
The Palau government has agreed to host a large United States Air Force high-frequency radar station in Palau, a Tactical Multi-Mission Over the Horizon Radar (TACMOR) system costing well over $100 million, which is expected to be operational in 2026.

Palau has participated in various U.S. military exercises over the years including Exercise Valiant Shield. The first-launch in Palau of a Patriot surface-to-air missile by the U.S. took place in 2022 Valiant Shiel, which also had the experimental deployment of A-10 Warthogs at Roman Tmetuchl International Airport.

See also
 Compact of Free Association
 List of diplomatic missions in Palau
 List of diplomatic missions of Palau
 Trust Territory of the Pacific Islands

References

External links
Republic of Palau Mission to the United Nations
Republic of Palau Honorary Consulate-General to the United Kingdom of Great Britain & Northern Ireland
Republic of Palau Honorary Consulate-General to Belgium

Representations of Palau to other nations
Embassy of Palau in Washington D.C.
Republic of Palau Honorary Consulate-General to the United Kingdom of Great Britain & Northern Ireland
Republic of Palau Honorary Consulate-General to Belgium

Representations of other nations to Palau
Australian Embassy in Palau Note:Handles relations with Palau
Consular links with Israel: 
 http://pidp.eastwestcenter.org/pireport/2008/January/01-04-11.htm

 
Government of Palau